Iowa (SSN-797), a , will be the fourth U.S. Navy vessel named for the state of Iowa. Secretary of the Navy Ray Mabus officially announced the name on September 2, 2015, during a news briefing at Iowa State University.

References

Submarine classes
Virginia-class submarines
Submarines of the United States Navy
Submarines of the United States